The Ada Gaming Center is a Native American casino in Ada, Oklahoma. The center is the first gaming facility that was founded by the Chickasaw Nation, having started out as a bingo hall in 1983. The center has seven tables for blackjack and Ultimate Texas Hold 'em, and more than 330 electronic gaming machines.

See also
List of casinos in Oklahoma 
List of casino hotels

References

Casinos in Oklahoma
Chickasaw Nation casinos
Buildings and structures in Pontotoc County, Oklahoma
Tourist attractions in Pontotoc County, Oklahoma
Ada, Oklahoma